Guanyin Famen or Quan Yin Buddhism (Chinese: 觀音法門), the teachings of Meditation Society of ROC (Chinese: 中華民國禪定學會) or Ching Hai World Society (Chinese: 清海世界會), is a school of Mahayana Buddhism-like cult found in 1988 by the ethnic-Chinese Vietnamese teacher Ching Hai.

Guanyin Famen is one of the religious organizations officially suppressed in the People's Republic of China due to its legal status as a "heterodox teaching". This designation was first given to the organization in 1995 and was re-affirmed in 2014 and 2017. The government's 2017  website listed Guanyin Famen as one of eleven "dangerous" groups, a more serious designation than merely appearing on the list of twenty suppressed groups.

As such, it has made the leap to cyberspace and become a kind of cybersect.

See also
 Heterodox teachings (Chinese law)

References

Buddhist new religious movements
Religious organizations established in 1988

Chinese cults